Murat Gökhan Bardakçı (born 25 December 1955) is a Turkish journalist working on Ottoman history and Turkish music history. He is also a columnist for Habertürk newspaper.

Biography
Bardakçı was born in 1955 in İstanbul. An economist by training, he was trained in Turkish classical music by some of the most-reputed contemporary masters, in tambur and singing at first, with his primary interests directed more towards theory and musical history later. He published several researches on musical history (notably the biographies of the composers Abd al-Qadir Maraghi and Refik Fersan) and with the start of a journalistic career in Hürriyet, expanded the scope of his writings on Ottoman and general Islamic history, with marked emphasis on the 19th and the early-20th centuries. Two of his books on the end of the Ottoman dynasty, "Son Osmanlılar" (The Last Ottomans) and Şahbaba (literally, The Emperor-father), a biography of Mehmed VI Vahideddin, became best-sellers in Turkey, the former also having been carried over to the screen in the form a TV serial.

He married Ayşegül Manav in 2009.

Since 2008 he has co-hosted the history programme "Tarihin Arka Odası" (The Backroom of History) and its successor "Tarihin İzinde" (On the Track of History) with historian Erhan Afyoncu and several others, including Turkish art historian Nurhan Atasoy, on Haberturk TV.

He is able to speak Arabic, French, English and Persian

Talat Pasha's Black Book

Murat Bardakçı is the editor of the Black Book, Ottoman Minister of Interior Talat Pasha's recording of relocations of Turkish-Muslim and Armenian Christian Ottoman citizens in World War I conditions. Published by Bardakçı for the first time in 2005, they were handed over to him by Talat Pasha's widow, Hayriye Talat Bafralı, along with a batch of other documents comprising letters he had sent her and telegrammes exchanged between Committee of Union and Progress members. In April 2006, Bardakçı re-edited the black book in full, adding parts that were missing in the first publication. The 1915-1916 resettlements cited in Talat Pasha Black Book of 702,905 Turks from regions under threat of occupation by Russian forces and of 924,158 Armenians in accordance with 27 May 1915 Tehcir Law.

Criticism of Wikipedia and disputes
Bardakçı's view of history and arguments in his columns and programs lead to some disputes in Turkish media. Besides this, he is critical of the accuracy of Wikipedia. Giving the example of his own biography on Wikipedia having falsely put forward that he had four children, and emphasizing the negative implications of such an accessible source upon students' academic performance in the form of plagiarism, he declared that  the Turkish version of Wikipedia should be banned in Turkey.

On the other hand, although he emphasises that he is not a historian, his works mainly contain historical documents and its interpretations and yet he can be qualified as being close to the English school of history writing in the context of historical method or historiography but this side of his works usually finds no reference in his books.

Bibliography
Abd al-Qadir Maraghi, Pan Publishing, 1986, .
The Last Ottomans & The Deportation and Heritage of Ottoman Dynasty, Pan Publishing - İnkılâp Bookstore, 1991, .
Royal Compositions (The Works of Last Sultan of the Ottomans, Mehmet Vahideddin VI), Pan Publishing, 1997, .
Turkish Songs for Fener Rulers, Pan Publishing, 1993, .
Sex in Ottomans, Gür Publishing - İnkılâp Bookstore, 1993, .
Mr. Refik (Refik Fersan and His Memories), Pan Publishing, 1995, .
Şahbaba: The Life, Memories and Private Letters of Last Sultan of the Ottomans, Mehmed VI Vahdeddin, Pan Publishing - İnkılâp Bookstore, 1998, .
The Abandoned Documents of Talât Pasha, Everest Publishing, 2009, .
 Neslişah: Cumhuriyet Devrinde Bir Osmanlı Prensesi, Everest Publishing, 2011, .
 Ahmed Oğlu Şükrullah: Şükrullah'ın Risalesi ve 15. Yüzyıl Şark Musikisi Nazariyatı, İstanbul, 2012, .
 Üçüncü Selim Devrine Ait Bir Bostancıbaşı Defteri, Pan Publishing, 2013, .
 İttihadçı'nın Sandığı, İş Bankası Kültür Publishing, 2014, .
 Mahmut Şevket Paşa'nın Sadaret Günlüğü, İş Bankası Kültür Publishing, 2014, .
 Enver, İş Bankası Kültür Publishing, 2015, .

Footnotes

External links
 Archive of articles by Murat Bardakçı in the newspaper Sabah

Turkish journalists
Turkish columnists
20th-century Turkish historians
Writers from Istanbul
1955 births
Living people
21st-century Turkish historians
Historians of World War I
Turkish people of Crimean Tatar descent
Turkish people of Circassian descent
Critics of Wikipedia
Habertürk people
Turkish television talk show hosts